Tim Petrovic (born August 16, 1966) is an American professional golfer. He won one PGA Tour event, and has finished runner-up in four senior major golf championships.

Early life 
Petrovic was born in Northampton, Massachusetts. He played college golf for the Hartford Hawks, and was an NCAA Division I All-American selection in 1988. Petrovic was a teammate of future PGA Tour professional Jerry Kelly. He was inducted into University of Hartford's Alumni Athletic Hall of Fame in 1995.

Professional career 
Petrovic turned professional in 1988. He joined the Nike Tour (now known as the Korn Ferry Tour) in 1994, and first earned his PGA Tour card in 2002. Petrovic won one PGA Tour event, the 2005 Zurich Classic of New Orleans.

Petrovic's career high Official World Golf Ranking (OWGR) was 65th in 2005. He earned over 12 million dollars on the PGA Tour, with over $1.7 million in both 2003 and 2005.

After not being fully exempt on the regular tour for five years, Petrovic joined PGA Tour Champions after turning 50 in 2016 and debuted at the Boeing Classic near Seattle in August. 

He finished runner-up in the 2018 and 2021 Senior PGA Championship, 2018 U.S. Senior Open, and 2019 Senior Players Championship. He also finished third in the 2019 Senior British Open Championship.

Amateur wins
this list may be incomplete
1986 New England Amateur
1988 Connecticut Amateur

Professional wins (1)

PGA Tour wins (1)

PGA Tour playoff record (1–1)

Results in major championships

WD  = Withdrew
CUT = missed the half-way cut

Results in The Players Championship

CUT = missed the halfway cut
"T" indicates a tie for a place

Results in World Golf Championships

Results in senior major championships

"T" indicates a tie for a place
CUT = missed the halfway cut
NT = No tournament due to COVID-19 pandemic

See also
2001 Buy.com Tour graduates

References

External links

Charity founded by Tim and Julie Petrovic

American male golfers
Hartford Hawks men's golfers
PGA Tour golfers
PGA Tour Champions golfers
Korn Ferry Tour graduates
Golfers from Massachusetts
Golfers from Texas
People from Northampton, Massachusetts
1966 births
Living people